Peter of Poitiers (Latin: Petrus Pictaviensis) was a French scholastic theologian, born at Poitiers or in its neighbourhood about 1130. He died in Paris, probably in 1215.

Life

He studied at the University of Paris, where he became professor of theology and lectured for thirty-eight years. In 1169 he succeeded Peter Comestor in the chair of scholastic theology. His lectures were inspired the enmity of Gauthier de St-Victor, one of the bitterest opponents of Scholasticism, who ranked him with Gilbert de la Porrée, Abelard, and Peter Lombard in the pamphlet wherein he tries to throw ridicule on the four doctors, under the name of the Four Labyrinths of France.

According to the prologue to his Compendium historiae in genealogia Chirsti, Peter wanted to assist his students in learning Biblical history, both because it is very long and because textbooks were too expensive for his students to afford. Therefore he composed the Compendium, which is a condensed version of Biblical history in the form of a genealogy of Christ. An obituary of Peter, written by Alberic of Trois Fontaines, asserts that he had such diagrams sketched out on skins. It has become a commonplace among scholars to assume this to mean Peter had those diagrams hung on walls as a didactic aid. 

In 1191 he was appointed by Pope Celestine III to settle a dispute between the Abbeys of St-Eloi and St-Victor. He was a constant correspondent of Celestine III and Pope Innocent III. Certain writers believe that he died Bishop of Embrun; the Gallia Christiana Nova shows that he was only Chancellor of Paris.

Works

In 1179 he published five books of sentences which are a synopsis of his lectures. His doctrine is orthodox, but, though containing no condemned proposition, it arguably exhibits more subtlety than theology based on Holy Scripture.

He wrote commentaries, still unedited, on Exodus, Leviticus, Numbers, and the Psalms. A chronological and genealogical abridgment of the Bible is attributed to him, but the authorship is uncertain.  His works were published by Dom Hugo Mathoud with those of Robert Pullus (Paris, 1855).

Notes

References

External links
 Lewis E 72 Compendium Historiae in Genealogia Christi (Historical Compendium of the Genealogy of Christ), with a treatise on the candelabrum at OPenn

1215 deaths
12th-century French Catholic theologians
People from Poitiers
Scholastic philosophers
Year of birth uncertain
Chancellors of the University of Paris
Medieval Paris
13th-century French Catholic theologians
University of Paris alumni
French male writers
12th-century Latin writers